Luis Miguel Rodríguez (born May 3, 1973) is a baseball player for Cuba. He was pitcher in the Cuban team which won a silver medal at the 2008 Summer Olympics.

References

1973 births
Living people
2009 World Baseball Classic players
Olympic baseball players of Cuba
Baseball players at the 2008 Summer Olympics
Olympic silver medalists for Cuba
Olympic medalists in baseball
Medalists at the 2008 Summer Olympics
21st-century Cuban people